Our Lady of Ostrobrama Parish is designated for Polish immigrants in Brockton, Massachusetts, United States.

It was one of the Polish-American Roman Catholic parishes in New England in the Archdiocese of Boston.

Founded in 1914. Closed on December 31, 2001, as a part of plan of Archdiocese of Boston

References

Bibliography 
 Our Lady of Czestochowa Parish - Centennial 1893-1993

External links 
 Roman Catholic Archdiocese of Boston
 Diocesan information - Our Lady of Ostrobrama Parish

Roman Catholic parishes of Archdiocese of Boston
Polish-American Roman Catholic parishes in Massachusetts
Christian organizations established in 1914